Agave guadalajarana is a smallish Agave species endemic to Mexico. It is native to the Guadalajara region of Jalisco state, and the Ceboruco volcano area of Nayarit state.

Description 
About  in diameter, A. guadalajarana grows as a basal rosette of grey-green leaves with distinctive overlapment marks. The edges of the leaves have big spines and they end each in a thick brown spine.

The species is often confused with a similar species, Agave inaequidens.

Cultivation 
Agave guadalajarana is cultivated as an ornamental plant. Easy to grow, it is best propagated by seed directly into the intended soil for the adult plant.

Multiple fertilizations is good during vegetation and the plant is best grown in a decently sized container.

References 

The Complete Encyclopedia of Succulents by Zdenek Jezek and Libor Kunte

guadalajarana
Endemic flora of Mexico
Flora of Jalisco
Flora of Nayarit
Plants described in 1920
Garden plants of North America